The 1995 Copa Libertadores Final was a two-legged football match-up to determine the 1995 Copa Libertadores champion. It was contested by Brazilian team Grêmio and Colombian club Atlético Nacional. In the first leg, held in Estádio Olímpico in Porto Alegre, Gremio beat Atlético Nacional 31. In the second leg, held in Estadio Atanasio Girardot in Medellín, both teams tied 1–1 therefore Gremio won 3–1 on points, achieving their second Copa Libertadores.

Qualified teams

Venues

Match details

First leg

Second leg

External links
CONMEBOL's official website

1
Copa Libertadores Finals
Copa Libertadores Final 1995
Copa Libertadores Final 1995
1995 in Brazilian football